The 2016 League1 Ontario season was the second season of play for the League1 Ontario Women's Division, a Division 3 semi-professional soccer league in the Canadian soccer pyramid and the highest level of soccer based in the Canadian province of Ontario.

This season saw the departure of two teams from its inaugural season, while four teams joined the league to result in a nine-team competition.

Changes from 2015 
The women's division enters its second season with nine teams, after the addition of four teams (Aurora United FC, Darby FC, Kingston Clippers, and FC London) and the departure of two teams (ANB Futbol and ProStars FC) from the previous season.  It will remain in a single-table format for the 2016 season.

Teams

Standings 
Each team plays 16 matches as part of the season; three games split home and away against every other team in the division.  There are no playoffs; the first-place team is crowned as league champion at the end of the season.

Cup 
The L1 Cup tournament is a separate contest from the rest of the season, in which all nine teams from the women's division take part.  It is not a form of playoffs at the end of the season (as is typically seen in North American sports), but is more like the Canadian Championship or the FA Cup, albeit only for League1 Ontario teams.  All matches are separate from the regular season and are not reflected in the season standings.

The cup tournament for the women's division is a single-match knockout tournament with three total rounds culminating in a final match at the end of July, with initial matchups determined by random draw.  A preliminary round is also in place to bring the nine total teams from this division down to eight for the quarterfinals.  Each match in the tournament must return a result; any match drawn after 90 minutes will advance directly to kicks from the penalty mark instead of extra time.

Preliminary Round

Quarterfinals

Semifinals

Final

Statistics

Top Goalscorers 

Source:

Top Goalkeepers 

Minimum 450 minutes played.  Source:

All-star game 

On July 14, the league announced an all-star game between top players in L1O and a team assembled by the Quebec Soccer Federation.

L1O's 20-player roster was selected by coaches and league officials, and contains at least one player from every team in the league.  Players denoted by an asterisk (*) are part of the starting 11.

Awards 

 First Team All-Stars 

 Second Team All-Stars

References

External links 

League1
League1 Ontario (women) seasons